Martin Stepek (born 19 February 1959) is a Scottish mindfulness teacher and campaigner, poet and author.

Early life and education
The son of Polish-Scottish businessman Jan Stepek, notable for his chain of electrical goods stores in and around Glasgow, he was born in Cambuslang and attended St. Mary's Roman Catholic Primary, in Hamilton and St. Joseph's College, a boarding school run by the Marist Brothers. He went to the University of Strathclyde where he received a law degree and post-graduate diploma in legal practice in 1981.

Career
In June 1987, Stepek began working in his family business J. Stepek Limited as a trainee marketing manager. He became a company director in 1990, of J Stepek Ltd and its subsidiary, Stepek Travel.

In summer 1998, Stepek began to practice mindfulness. From 1999 he began attending a Tibetan Buddhist meditation classes and in 2004 was asked to become a teacher of Buddhism and its practice despite his doubts in some of the traditional teachings.

Stepek had written poetry and at his first public reading in Glasgow in 2009, Etta Dunn, the entrepreneur and owner of publishers Fleming Publications, was amongst the audience. She approached Stepek about the possibility of a book on his father's life and the poems he had written on the subject. This became his first book, For There is Hope / Bo Jest Nadzieja. The book won the NABE Pinnacle Prize in 2013 in the US and runner up in the UK's People's Book Prize the same year.

Stepek had started writing a weekly newsletter on mindfulness, which was compiled in 2014 and 2015 to form the book collections Mindful Living and Mindful Living 2. The former was a finalist in the People's Book Prize. Fleming Publications also released Mindful Poems, a short collections of verse. In November 2017, Stepek's fifth book, and his third volume of poetry, Waiting for Guzlowski, co-written by John Guzlowski, was released.

In 2013 Stepek was invited to perform two events at the Edinburgh Fringe Festival. As part of this a film, later titled The Poetry of Hope, was commissioned and made, directed by Etta Dunn and produced by Stepek.

In 2013 he produced another film, about his father's life before he settled in Scotland, with the help of the Polish-Scottish Heritage project,  called For There is Hope. It was directed by Pawel Nuckowski and was shown in Warsaw as part of a lecture and talk tour Stepek made in 2015.

In January 2017, Martin Stepek became the Sunday Herald Columnist on Mindfulness and now writes a column each week for them.

Political activity
Stepek joined the Scottish Green Party in 2001 and the following year was co-opted onto the party's national Council that year at the party's annual conference. The following year he was asked to stand as a candidate for the position of Convenor of the council. Stepek stood down at the end of his first year in office. In 2008 to 2010 he was co-opted as Convenor of Operations in the party. As of 2017 he remains a member of the Scottish Green Party.

Personal life 
Stepek's Polish-born father Jan was relatively famous in local circles as the founder of a chain of electrical stores and served as the chairman of the football club Hamilton Academical for several years. One of ten siblings, Martin married Christine McAra in March 1988 and they have two children. He lives with his wife in Hamilton, Scotland.

Awards
 2011 Family Business Ambassador of the Year, London, Family Business Place 
 2013 NABE Pinnacle Prize, Best Bilingual Book – For There is Hope
 2013 Runner Up, UK People's Book Prize – For There is Hope
 2015 Finalist, UK People's Book Prize – Mindful Living
 2017 Zloty Krzyz Zaslugi, Gold Cross of Merit, Republic of Poland

Bibliography
 (2009) Contributed six poems and the Afterword to Waiting to be Heard: The Polish Christian Experience Under Nazi and Stalinist Oppression 1939-1955 by Bogusia J Wojciechowska
 (2011) Contribution to anthology - Family Legends, Luath Press
(2012) For There is Hope / Bo Jest Nadzieja, Fleming Publications
 (2013) Contribution to anthology – Treasures, Scottish Book Trust
 (2014) Mindful Living: Positive Steps to Manage Stress and Achieve Peace of Mind, Fleming Publications
 (2015) Mindful Poems: of Hope and Experience, Fleming Publications
 (2015) Mindful Living 2: Positive Steps to Manage Stress and Achieve Peace of Mind, Fleming Publications
 (2017) Waiting for Guzlowski: On War and Peace – with John Guzlowski, Fleming Publications

References

External links
 
Alumnus Profile at the University of Strathclyde Business School

1959 births
Living people
Mindfulness movement
Scottish Green Party politicians
Scottish columnists
Scottish people of Polish descent
Alumni of the University of Strathclyde
People from Hamilton, South Lanarkshire
People educated at St Joseph's College, Dumfries
People from Cambuslang
Scottish business families